www.handy-games.com GmbH, doing business as HandyGames, is a German video game developer and publisher based in Giebelstadt. In July 2018, the company was acquired by THQ Nordic.

History
The company was founded in 2000 by brothers Christopher and Markus Kassulke along with Udo Bausewein. In 2006, HandyGames released its first free, ad-funded game and began the gradual transition to a largely ad-funded business model. Since 2010, all new HandyGames mobile titles are either free or freemium. By 2014 HandyGames had 150,000 app downloads per month and more than 100 million downloads in total.

In 2012, HandyGames expanded onto other platforms like PC or Smart TVs. In January 2014 and 2015, the company were main sponsors for the "HandyGames Charity Day" in Würzburg, which aimed to raise funds for cancer research. On both occasions the event was able to raise roughly 50000 Euros.

HandyGames was one of the first companies to launch games for wearable technology in 2014. The games are compatible with Android Wear devices, including the Moto 360 by Motorola, the Huawei Watch, the Sony SmartWatch and the LG G Watch.

The company began developing VR (virtual reality) games 2015 and released titles like "Hidden Temple – VR Adventure". They can be played in 360° mode or in VR using one of the supported head-mounted displays like Oculus Rift, Samsung Gear VR, or Google Cardboard.
Simultaneously, HandyGames began developing games for the Eighth generation of video game consoles like the PlayStation 4, Xbox One or later the Nintendo Switch.

On 9 July 2018, THQ Nordic announced that it had acquired HandyGames and all of its intellectual property. THQ Nordic said that the studio management and all employees remain with the company.

Townsmen Expeditions (working title), which will mark the most recent entry in the Townsmen IP, received €150,000 development funding from Creative Europe. As of 2020, HandyGames employs 60 people.

In May 2021, Embracer Group announced the acquisition of Massive Miniteam by HandyGames, which will be fully integrated within the HandyGames organization, under the operative group THQ Nordic.

Awards 
  — Bestes Studio (Best German Studio)

Games

References

External links
 

German companies established in 2000
2018 mergers and acquisitions
Companies based in Bavaria
THQ Nordic divisions and subsidiaries
Video game companies established in 2000
Video game companies of Germany
Video game development companies
Video game publishers